Leipzig Coppiplatz is a railway station located in Leipzig, Germany. The station is located on the Leipzig–Großkorbetha railway. The train services are operated by Deutsche Bahn. Since December 2013 the station is served by the S-Bahn Mitteldeutschland.

Train services
S-Bahn Mitteldeutschland services currently call at the station:

References

External links

Coppiplatz
Leipzig Coppi